Make Room can stand for several things:

"Make Room", a song by Helmet from Strap It On
Make Room, a 1986 album by New Zealand musician Luke Hurley
Make Room (album), 2018 album by Jonathan McReynolds
Make Room! Make Room!, a dystopian science-fiction novel by Harry Harrison, the basis of the Soylent Green movie
Makeroom, a 2018 Nigerian film

See also
"Make Room for Lisa", a 1999 episode of The Simpsons